Percival Sumner "Pop" Rising (January 24, 1877 – January 28, 1938) was an American right fielder in Major League Baseball who played briefly for the Boston Americans during the  season.  Rising was born in Industry, Pennsylvania. He threw right-handed (unknown batting side).  He was purchased by the Boston Americans from the New London, Connecticut team for $1,200 (August 8, 1905).

In an 11-game career, Rising was a .103 hitter (3-for-29) with two runs, two RBI, one double and one triple without home runs. In six outfield appearances, he never committed an error in nine chances for a perfect 1.000 fielding percentage. He also played an errorless game at third base (two chances).

Rising died in Rochester, Pennsylvania at age 56.

External links

Retrosheet

1877 births
1938 deaths
Boston Americans players
Major League Baseball right fielders
Baseball players from Pennsylvania
New London Whalers players
Springfield Ponies players
New Bedford Whalers (baseball) players
Lowell Grays players
People from Beaver County, Pennsylvania